This article lists Federal Ministers of Food, Agriculture and Consumer Protection of Germany and the equivalents of this office which preceded it.

German Reich (1919–1945)

|-
! colspan="8"| Weimarer Republik (1919–1933)
|-

|-
! colspan="8"| Nazi Germany (1933–1945)
|-

Federal Republic of Germany (1949–present)
Political Party:

|- style="background:#EEEEFF" 
! colspan=8| Federal Minister for Food, Agriculture and Forests

|- style="background:#EEEEFF" 
! colspan=8| Federal Minister for Consumer Protection, Food and Agriculture

|- style="background:#EEEEFF" 
! colspan=8| Federal Minister for Food, Agriculture and Consumer Protection
 

|- style="background:#EEEEFF" 
! colspan=8| Federal Minister for Food and Agriculture

Lists of government ministers of Germany
Cabinets of Germany